Mihele (in older sources Miheli) is a small settlement in the Municipality of Hrpelje-Kozina in the Littoral region of Slovenia on the border with Italy.

The parish church just outside the settlement is dedicated to the Prophet Elijah. The parish is known as the Draga Parish, although the actual village of Draga ( or Draga Sant'Elia) is now on the Italian side of the border. It  belongs to the Koper Diocese.

References

External links

Mihele on Geopedia

Populated places in the Municipality of Hrpelje-Kozina